Timo Juhani Vihavainen (born 9 May 1947) is a Finnish historian and a professor of Russian Studies at the University of Helsinki. He has written extensively on Russian and Finnish history. Vihavainen graduated as a Master of Philosophy in 1970, a Licentiate in Philosophy in 1983, a Doctor of Philosophy degree in 1988 and a Docent in Russian history in 1992. He is a member of the Finnish Academy of Science and Letters since 2009.

References

Publications

Books in English

Books in Finnish

Books in Russian

1947 births
Living people
Finnish science writers
20th-century Finnish historians
Academic staff of the University of Helsinki
Members of the Finnish Academy of Science and Letters
Russian studies scholars
21st-century Finnish historians